The 5th Lewis-Evans Trophy was a motor race, run to Formula One rules, held on 1 October 1961 at Brands Hatch Circuit. The race was run over 30 laps of the circuit, and was dominated by British driver Tony Marsh  in a BRM P48.

This Formula One race was unusual in that non-British competitors were not permitted to take part. French driver Bernard Collomb, who had intended to enter the race, decided to lend his car to John Campbell-Jones.

Qualifying

Results

References
 "The Grand Prix Who's Who", Steve Small, 1995.
 "The Formula One Record Book", John Thompson, 1974.

Lewis-Evans Trophy